The Trần dynasty (1225–1440), found by Trần clan, was an imperial dynasty of Đại Việt that succeeded the Lý dynasty (1009–1225) and preceded the Hồ dynasty (1400–07). The first emperor of the dynasty was Trần Thái Tông (1218–77) and Trần Dynasty ended with the usurpation of throne from Trần Thiếu Đế (1396–?) by Hồ Quý Ly, the emperor's maternal grandfather.

Below is a complete list of emperors of the Trần dynasty, including their temple names, given names, and era names, each name is presented in Vietnamese alphabet and attached with its Hán tự (Chinese characters), posthumous names, which were usually very long and rarely used when referring to the sovereign, are presented in last column. Besides emperors, Đại Việt under Trần dynasty was often co-ruled by  who already ceded his throne in name but still reigned until his decease or complete retirement.

Emperors

Trần dynasty 

A: Before his death, Dụ Tông pass the throne to Dương Nhật Lễ ignoring the fact that Dương was not from the Trần clan. Dương Nhật Lễ was soon dethroned, demoted to the title of Hôn Đức Công (昏德公), and killed by members of the royal family.
B: Phế Đế was dethroned to Linh Đức đại vương (King of Linh Duc) by Retired Emperor Nghệ Tông after Hồ Quý Ly's advice.
C: Thuận Tông was obliged to pass the throne to Thiếu Đế by Hồ Quý Ly. Afterward he was forced to commit suicide after order of Hồ Quý Ly.
D: Thiếu Đế was overthrown by Hồ Quý Ly and was downgraded to Bảo Ninh đại vương (King of Bao Ninh).
E: His given name (An, 𤇼) was suggested by authors of Khâm định Việt sử Thông giám cương mục, the official historical book of Nguyễn dynasty, because they could not find the exact Chinese character for this sovereign.

Later Trần dynasty

Retired emperor

A: Being father of Trần Thái Tông, the first emperor of Trần Dynasty, Trần Thái Tổ was honoured with the title of Retired Emperor.
B: Thuận Tông was obliged to pass the throne to Thiếu Đế and become retired emperor by Hồ Quý Ly.

Chronicle

References

Citatioms

Sources

External links 
 

Trần dynasty
Trần dynasty
Trần dynasty

retired emperor